James Carl Moeller (July 2, 1955 – March 8, 2023) was an American politician and mental health professional who served as a member of the Washington State House of Representatives, representing the 49th Legislative District from 2003 to 2017. A member of the Democratic Party, he represented the Clark County communities of Hazel Dell, Walnut Grove, Minnehaha and his native Vancouver.

Rep. Moeller was one of Washington State's first openly gay lawmakers. 

During the 2013–14 Washington State House legislative session, he served as speaker pro tempore. He had previously served two terms as deputy speaker pro tempore (2007–10).

Moeller grew up in Vancouver. He went to Clark College and Washington State University, before doing graduate work at Portland State University.

Elected in 1995 to Vancouver City Council, he was re-elected to a second term in 1999. In 2002, when veteran legislator Val Ogden retired, Moeller ran to succeed her in the state House of Representatives. In a hotly contested Democratic primary, Moeller prevailed by less than 1,000 votes – winning 6,564 votes to his opponent's 5,615. He won the subsequent general election handily and took office in January 2003. He was subsequently re-elected at two-year intervals. He attempted to unseat incumbent U.S. Representative Jaime Herrera Beutler in 2016, and lost by 24 points.

Moeller died from complications of Parkinson's disease on March 8, 2023, at the age of 67.

References

External links
Campaign website

1955 births
2023 deaths
Deaths from Parkinson's disease
Politicians from Vancouver, Washington
Clark College alumni
Portland State University alumni
Washington State University alumni
Democratic Party members of the Washington House of Representatives
Washington (state) city council members
21st-century American politicians
20th-century American politicians
Candidates in the 2016 United States elections
LGBT state legislators in Washington (state)